Gibbula leucophaea is a species of sea snail, a marine gastropod mollusk in the family Trochidae, the top snails.

Description
The size of the shell varies between 5 mm and 7 mm. Compared with Gibbula adansonii, is the shell more solid, generally paler, and the base whitish. The spiral sculpture is stronger. The penultimate whorl has about 5 well-marked, separated spiral lirae. The body whorl is angulate at the periphery.

Distribution
This species occurs in the Mediterranean Sea and in the Atlantic Ocean off the Azores.

References

 Philippi R. A., 1836: Enumeratio molluscorum Siciliae cum viventium tum in tellure tertiaria fossilium, quae in itinere suo observavit. Vol. 1; Schropp, Berlin [Berolini] xiv + 267 p., pl. 1-12 
 Anton H. E., 1839: Verzeichniss der Conchylien welche sich in der Sammlung von Hermann Eduard Anton befinden; Halle XVI + 110 p
 Coen G., 1937: Nuovo saggio di una sylloge molluscorum Adriaticorum ; Memoria Reale Comitato Talassografico Italiano 240, 1–173, 10 pls
 Gofas, S.; Le Renard, J.; Bouchet, P. (2001). Mollusca, in: Costello, M.J. et al. (Ed.) (2001). European register of marine species: a check-list of the marine species in Europe and a bibliography of guides to their identification. Collection Patrimoines Naturels, 50: pp. 180–213

External links
 

leucophaea
Gastropods described in 1836